Alberto Carlos Bastos Lopes (born 22 October 1959) is a Portuguese former footballer who played mainly as a central defender but also as a defensive midfielder, and is a manager.

Over ten seasons, he amassed Primeira Liga totals of 130 matches and seven goals.

Club career
Born in Lisbon, Bastos Lopes progressed through S.L. Benfica's youth system, arriving in the first team after a loan spell at neighbouring G.D. Estoril Praia. However, due to stiff competition from Humberto Coelho and António Oliveira in defense and Shéu and Glenn Strömberg in midfield, he appeared only as a substitute on most occasions; additionally, he was loaned to G.D. Estoril-Praia for the 1979–80 season, and to C.F. Os Belenenses for 1984–85.

After leaving in the summer of 1985, Bastos Lopes continued competing always in the Primeira Liga in the following campaigns, with F.C. Penafiel and S.C. Braga. He nearly signed for Deportivo de La Coruña in 1988, but did not pass his medical.

Bastos Lopes retired in 1989, at the age of only 29. He subsequently started a lengthy managerial career, never in higher than the third division. In 2004, he led Benfica's juniors to the national championship.

International career
Bastos Lopes represented Portugal at the 1979 FIFA World Youth Championship, helping the nation to the quarter-finals.

Personal life
Bastos Lopes' older brother, António, was also a footballer and a defender. He too represented Benfica, with more success.

Honours
Benfica
Primeira Liga (7): 1980–81, 1982–83, 1983–84
Taça de Portugal (5): 1980–81, 1982–83
Supertaça Cândido de Oliveira (2); Runner-up 1981
Taça de Honra (7)
UEFA Cup: Runner-up 1983–84

References

External links

1959 births
Living people
Footballers from Lisbon
Portuguese footballers
Association football defenders
Association football midfielders
Association football utility players
Primeira Liga players
S.L. Benfica footballers
G.D. Estoril Praia players
C.F. Os Belenenses players
F.C. Penafiel players
S.C. Braga players
AD Fafe players
Portugal youth international footballers
Portugal under-21 international footballers
Portuguese football managers
S.U. Sintrense managers